Khosro Daneshjou is an Iranian academic and conservative politician who served as a member of the City Council of Tehran from 2003 to 2013, among the pro-Ahmadinejad faction.

References 

Living people
Alliance of Builders of Islamic Iran politicians
Coalition of the Pleasant Scent of Servitude politicians
Tehran Councillors 2007–2013
Tehran Councillors 2003–2007
Year of birth missing (living people)